Brightwood is a census-designated place (CDP) in Madison County, Virginia. Its ZIP Code is 22715. The population as of the 2020 Census was 1,064.

References

Virginia Trend Report 2: State and Complete Places (Sub-state 2010 Census Data)

Unincorporated communities in Virginia
Census-designated places in Madison County, Virginia
Census-designated places in Virginia